Mount Vance is a mountain (840 m) rising between Mount LeMasurier and Mount McCrory in the Ickes Mountains of Marie Byrd Land. It was mapped by the United States Geological Survey (USGS) from surveys and U.S. Navy air photos, 1959–65, and was named by the Advisory Committee on Antarctic Names (US-ACAN) for Dale L. Vance, an ionospheric scientist at Byrd Station, 1963, and U.S. Exchange Scientist to the Vostok station, 1971.

Mountains of Marie Byrd Land